The Ottawa Car Company was a builder of streetcars for the Canadian market and was founded in Ottawa, Ontario, in 1891 as an outgrowth of the carriage building operations of William W. Wylie. Its plant was located at Kent and Slater Streets (south side of Slater between Kent and Lyon Streets - now site of Constitution Square), a short distance from Parliament Hill. The company was a subsidiary of Ottawa Electric Railway, in turn controlled by Ahearn & Soper.

It was renamed Ottawa Car Manufacturing Company in 1917 and again as Ottawa Car and Aircraft Limited in 1937.

The Ahearn family retained control of the company until 1948 when they sold Ottawa Car & Aircraft Corporation (renamed during World War II) to the Mailman Corporation. The new owners never carried on the business and ceased operations as streetcars were being abandoned by cities across North America. The city of Ottawa abandoned its own streetcar network in 1959.  The company produced a total of about 1700 vehicles.

On 19 August 1994 Canada Post issued 88¢ stamps featuring Ottawa Car Company Streetcar, 1894, Saint John Railway Co. Car #40.

Products

Streetcars
 Small Peter Witt streetcars
 Snow sweepers
 Interurban railcars:
 8 R Class radial cars for Toronto and York Radial Railway on the Mimico line then transferred to Toronto Transportation Commission for use by North Yonge Railways
 Single End Double Truck streetcar

Aircraft

 produced Armstrong Whitworth Atlas and Armstrong Whitworth Siskin fighters for Armstrong Whitworth
 produced Avro Tutor and Avro Prefect trainers for Avro
 Armstrong Siddeley engines
 Aircraft parts for World War II: Handley Page Hampden bombers, Hawker Hurricanes and Avro Ansons
 bomb doors, flaps, ailerons, and elevators for Avro Lancaster bombers

Clients
 Edmonton Radial Railway
 Toronto Transportation Commission
 Ottawa Transportation Commission (Ottawa Electric Railway)
 Hamilton Street Railway (Hamilton Radial Electric Railway)
 Winnipeg Transit
 Montreal Street Railway
 South Western Traction Company/London & Lake Erie Railway
 Windsor, Essex and Lake Shore Rapid Railway
 London Street Railway
 Montreal Tramways Company
 Saskatoon Municipal Railway

Preservation

See also
 List of tram builders

References

Horsecar manufacturers
Manufacturing companies based in Ottawa
Defunct rolling stock manufacturers of Canada
Electric vehicle manufacturers of Canada